Koro is an Oceanic language spoken on Gaua island in Vanuatu. Its 280 speakers live in the village of Koro, on the south coast of Gaua.

Koro is a distinct language from its immediate neighbours, Dorig (300 sp.) and Olrat (4 sp.).

Name
The name Koro, spelled natively as Kōrō , is an endonym referring to the village.

Phonology
Koro has 8 phonemic vowels. These include 7 monophthongs  and one diphthong .

Grammar
The system of personal pronouns in Koro contrasts clusivity, and distinguishes four numbers (singular, dual, trial, plural).

Spatial reference in Koro is based on a system of geocentric (absolute) directionals, which is typical of Oceanic languages.

Notes and references

References

Bibliography

 .

External links
 Linguistic map of north Vanuatu, showing range of Koro on Gaua.
 Audio recordings in the Koro language, in open access, by A. François (Pangloss Collection).

Languages of Vanuatu
Banks–Torres languages
Torba Province
Definitely endangered languages